Pseudidonauton bhaga is a species of moth of the family Limacodidae. It is found on Borneo, Peninsular Malaysia and Sumatra.

References 

Limacodidae
Moths described in 1901
Taxa named by Charles Swinhoe
Moths of Asia